Kualanamu International Airport  (often spelled as Kuala Namu and informally abbreviated KNIA) is an international airport serving Medan, Indonesia, and other parts of North Sumatra. It is located in the Deli Serdang Regency, 23 km east of downtown Medan. Kualanamu is the third-largest airport in Indonesia after Jakarta Soekarno–Hatta and Bandung Kertajati, and the fifth busiest airport in Indonesia as of 2018, as well as the first Indonesian airport to receive four stars rating from Skytrax.

The airport was opened to public on 25 July 2013, handling all flights and services from Polonia International Airport, an airport located at the heart of Medan which was deemed dangerous. The airport was built on the former site of an oil palm plantation of company Perkebunan Nusantara II Tanjung Morawa. The airport is expected to become the new international transit center in Sumatra and the western part of Indonesia. It is part of the Indonesian central government's "Masterplan to Accelerate and Expand Economic Development in Indonesia" (MP3EI) program. The airport was also considered as a candidate for ASEAN Single Aviation Market (ASEAN-SAM), an open skies policy among member-countries in the Southeast Asia region starting 2015.

Etymology 
The name for the airport was reported to be suggestions from the people of Karo to the government and later granted by the Ministry of Transportation. The name consists of two words: 'Kuala,' a Malay and Indonesian word for 'river mouth;' and 'Namu' or 'Namo,' the Karonese for 'deep sea.' Thus, 'Kualanamu' means 'meeting point.' Kualanamu is considered the very few airports not named after Indonesian heroes. It could have also been inspired by Kuala Lumpur International Airport.

History

Polonia Airport was the site of several accidents. It is located in the center of the city, giving a challenging takeoff path and a relatively short runway. The development of Kualanamu Airport initiated in 1991. In a visit to Medan, Azwar Anas, Minister of Transport at the time, stated that for the sake of aviation safety, a new airport would be developed outside of the city of Medan.

Preparation of construction began in 1997, but the Asian Financial Crisis that started in the same year postponed the development of it. Demands for the new airport continued following the Mandala Airlines Flight 091 accident in September 2005 that occurred shortly after taking off from Polonia for Jakarta. This accident killed the incumbent North Sumatran governor at that time Tengku Rizal Nurdin and his predecessor Raja Inal Siregar, who died a day later. This accident also involved ground casualties with at least 50 casualties, as the airport is very close to overcrowded residential areas and the runway was only 3,000 meters, which although considered long for European standards, is short for Indonesian standards due to it being at a lower latitude from the equator, meaning it is warmer and as a result the air is thinner, which ultimately means that longer runway distances are needed.

All 1,365 hectares of land was acquired between 1995 and 1997 and with the certificate Exploitation Rights (Hak Pengelolaaan) No. 1 on 29 November 1999 and 100% of the land belonged to PT Angkasa Pura II. Between 1999 and 2006, some people used parts of the land illegally as agricultural land and PT Angkasa Pura II (AP II) offered them monetary compensation to move elsewhere. Construction resumed on 29 June 2006, shortly before the first anniversary of the crash of Mandala Airlines Flight 091. Jusuf Kalla, vice President of Indonesia at the time, laid the first cornerstone. This marked the construction of Kualanamu after several years with no progress. Computer renderings showing a T-shape design were posted on the company's website. A visualization of the airport is also released. It was then predicted that the airport would be completed by 2010. With land acquisition as the biggest hurdle for this project, the airport's opening was delayed until 2013 due to lack of local government awareness. On 22 July, a trailer for the airport was released.

Soft opening 
A soft opening to the public was done on 25 July 2013. The airport's very first commercial departure was a domestic Garuda Indonesia GA181 ferry flight from Soekarno–Hatta International Airport Terminal 3 touching down at approximately 05:00 WIB.

Grand opening 
The airport was officially opened by President of the Republic of Indonesia Susilo Bambang Yudhoyono, which was marked by the signing of the stone inscription plaque on 27 March 2014.

Facilities and infrastructure

The airport is Indonesia's third largest, after Soekarno–Hatta International Airport and the new Kertajati International Airport, with a 224,298 m2 passenger terminal and will eventually have a capacity of 22 million passengers (2030). Kualanamu Airport has an automatic baggage handling system, thus becoming the first airport in Indonesia which does not need baggage porters.

The airport is equipped with a single 3,750 x 60-meter runway, and a 3,750m and 2,000m long parallel taxiway capable of accommodating wide-body aircraft, including category – F jets such as the Airbus A380, Boeing 747-8, and Antonov 225. It also includes an apron area measuring 664 m2 capable of handling 33 aircraft. It also has a 13,000 m2 cargo area that can handle 3 carriers with 65,000 tonnes/annum and 50,820 m2 parking capacity with 405 taxis, 55 busses, and 908 cars. It covers 1,365 ha of land, 20 km northeast of Polonia airport, 3 km from the sea, and on a site of area 6,5 x 2,1 km. Phase 1 of the new airport has a capacity to serve 8 million passengers annually, but at early 2014 has served 8.3 million passengers annualized. Phase 2 starts construction in mid-2015 to serve 25 million passengers. Phase III expansion of the airport includes expansion of the runway to allow the airport to accommodate the Airbus A380, and expansion of cargo area to 24,715 square meters from 13,450 square meters at present, and expansion of passenger terminal to 224,256 square meters to increase the capacity from 9 million passengers to 17 million passengers annually, which starts in 2018. AP II also plans to develop a 200 hectare plot of land for commercial area outside the passenger terminal. The commercial area is built with an "airport city" concept with 3, 4 and 5 star hotels, a hypermarket, office building, hospital and movie theater.

Currently, the ILS system in used is ILS CAT I for both Runway 05 and 23. Arrivals and departures are usually directed to Runway 23 while Runway 05 will be used depending on wind direction.

Airport hotel
A hotel located at 2nd floor named Horison Sky Kualanamu was built. It covers 7,000 square meters of area with the capacity of 140 rooms. Two other hotels, The Wing Hotel and The Crew, were also built.

Operations
Airside facilities are controlled by the Indonesian government, while landside facilities would be owned by a joint venture with PT Angkasa Pura II, which is expected to provide $350 million as an initial investment in return for a 30-year lease, after which ownership would revert to PT Angkasa Pura II. The airport will be linked to the city of Medan by a $10.7 million railway project. An 18 km highway is under construction improving the airport's road connection to the city of Medan. It will cost $1.5 billion and will have 4 interchange, 4 underpasses, 7 flyovers, and 3 toll gates.

The airport is the first in Indonesia with a publicly accessible check-in area (current Indonesian airports restrict access to ticket holders with security at the gate), as in a much larger and more spacious check-in area than the existing airport. The airport is designed by Wiratman & Associates, who had also designed several other new airports and office buildings in Indonesia. Computer renderings showing a T-shape design were posted on the company's website. Another rendering and masterplan can be found in Angkasa Pura II website. A visualization of the airport was also released. The Indonesian government hopes that Kualanamu "can compete with [Singapore] Changi, Bangkok, etc.," and making Kualanamu "an international hub."

Airlines and destinations

Passenger

Traffic and statistics

Ground transportation

Rail transport

Train services are operated by PT Railink, a joint venture between PT Angkasa Pura II and Indonesian Railway. It is the first integrated airport rail link in Indonesia. The trains were made in South Korea.

The route runs from Medan Main Station beside the Merdeka Square to Kualanamu International Airport railway station, providing the fastest way to reach the airport, taking 30 minutes, and the return taking 30 to 47 minutes. In May 2014, a double-tracking from Medan to the airport began. This will cut time travel by at least 10 minutes.

On 28 September 2022, Railink launched new stop-over at Bandar Khalipah Station in Deli Serdang. Estimated travel time from this station will take 20 minutes to reach the airport. Passengers can also take up journey from Bandar Khalipah Station to Medan Main Station with estimated travel time 10 minutes. Online bookings were made available directly from its website.

Roads
The airport is connected by the Medan–Kualanamu–Tebing Tinggi Toll Road, an expressway specifically made to connect the airport and city Tebing Tinggi and other parts of eastern North Sumatra, which is also part of the Trans-Sumatra Toll Road network. An arterial road connecting the city of Medan and the airport were also built as an alternative.

Bus
A state-owned bus company, Perum DAMRI, operates services to the airport. The DAMRI bus has only two bus shelters in Medan, on Gatot Subroto Road next to Plaza Medan Fair and at the Amplas bus terminal. It takes about 60 to 90 minutes to reach the airport (depending on departure point and traffic). 2 hours from more central Plaza Medan Fair are not uncommon. The fare is cheaper than a train ride to city. There is also a cab service which carries passengers to several destinations. Tour companies Paradep and Travel Nice Trans links the airport to Parapat via Pematang Siantar that is a main gateway to reach some popular destinations like Samosir Island and Lake Toba.

Taxis
Taxi costs about twice that of train tickets. Taxi operators that bring passengers to the airport are limited to Blue Bird, KARSA, MATRA, and Nice Trans. Grab and Go-Jek operate inside the airport. CNN Indonesia criticized Sokerno-Hatta International Airport for falling behind Kualanamu in "halal"-ing online taxis.

Regional hub
Kualanamu International Airport is plotted to be a Regional Hub as South Korea's Incheon International Airport brother airport, thus on 25 June 2012 an agreement has been signed of both party operators. Incheon's operator will assist Kualanamu's operator to become the regional hub with world-class standards.

In early 2014, Flying Fox Airways is still processing the hub license. On 1 May 2014, Indonesian flag-carrier Garuda Indonesia opened flight from Medan to Jeddah King Abdulaziz International Airport as an extension of the Hajj-special Makassar-Medan route.

Accolades
In June 2015, Kualanamu received a certificate from Skytrax as a "4-Star Airport", the first Indonesian airport to receive such title. On 16 June 2016, the airport won the Diamond Award for the Service Quality Award under the 'International Airports' category by Angkasa Pura II. In August 2019, the custom system of the airport received an accolade from the 2018 Innovation Competition by the Ministry of Finance, given by the Directorate General of Customs and Excise, along with Soekarno-Hatta International Airport.

Incidents 

 On 18 May 2013, a Malaysia Airlines Boeing 737-400 that was supposed to land on Polonia Airport, almost landed on unfinished-Kualanamu instead. The plane did not land but the landing gear had been released. The pilot throttled the plane to TO/GA as soon as he realized it, and made it back to Polonia safely.
 On 24 April 2015, a JT303, Lion Air Boeing 737-900er with the registration PK-LFT heading for Jakarta, had its engine on fire. Passengers were immediately evacuated via the emergency doors. Three people were reported to have bone fractures caused by jumping off the middle doors and were rushed to the nearest hospital directly. On 4:30 pm, a plane was provided for the passengers to fly to Jakarta safely.
 On 3 August 2017, a wing collision occurred involving JT197, a Lion Air Boeing 737-900ER with the registration PK-LJZ from Banda Aceh Sultan Iskandar Muda International Airport, and IW1252, a Wings Air ATR 72–500 with the registration PK-WFF heading for Cut Nyak Dhien Airport, a regional airport at the Meulaboh regency. Flight 197 tried avoiding the runway, but due to short distances, the collision occurred. Activities regarding flights in the airport were delayed for 20 minutes.
 On 26 September 2017 at around 12:30, Citilink Flight 885 to Batam had its A320-200's right wing covered in a swarm of bees, causing a 90 minutes delay. The ground crew then sprayed water at the wing, cleaned the wing and scattered the bees. It was revealed that a logging activity near the airport destroyed the bees' habitat, thus causing them to seek refuge at the airport.

See also 

 Aviation in Indonesia
 List of airports in Indonesia
 List of airports by ICAO code: W

References

External links

Official Website of Kualanamu International Airport
 Medan Airport – Indonesia Airport Global Website
 Horison Sky Kualanamu
 Railink Indonesia
Official Website of Angkasa Pura 2
Indonesia Economic Masterplan 2011–2025

 
Airports in North Sumatra
Airports established in 2013
2013 establishments in Indonesia